Tommie Belton Smiley, Jr. (February 18, 1944 – October 10, 2012) was a former American football player. Tom Smiley caught the first pass in Cincinnati Bengals history, a 2-yard reception from quarterback Dewey Warren on September 6, 1968.

References 

1944 births
2012 deaths
Sportspeople from Port Arthur, Texas
Players of American football from Texas
American football running backs
Cincinnati Bengals players
Denver Broncos (AFL) players
Houston Oilers players
Lamar Cardinals football players
American Football League players